Hibbertia obtusibracteata is a species of flowering plant in the family Dilleniaceae and is endemic to Kangaroo Island in South Australia. It is a much-branched shrub with linear leaves and bright yellow flowers, usually with six stamens arranged in a cluster on one side of two glabrous carpels.

Description 
There are usually six stamens in a single cluster on one side of the two glabrous carpels.

Taxonomy 
Hibbertia obtusibracteata was first formally described in 1995 by Hellmut R. Toelken in the Journal of the Adelaide Botanic Gardens from specimens collected on Kangaroo Island by Robert John Bates in 1986. The specific epithet (obtusibracteata) refers to the obtuse bracts of this species.

Distribution and habitat 
This hibbertia only occurs on Kangaroo Island where it grows in scrub and heath.

See also 
 List of Hibbertia species

References 

obtusibracteata
Flora of South Australia
Plants described in 1995
Taxa named by Hellmut R. Toelken